Alonzo M. "Lon" Poff (February 8, 1870 – August 8, 1952) was an American film actor who appeared in almost 100 films between 1917 and 1951. 

Born in Bedford, Indiana, he was the son of Mrs. Mary E. Poff, and he had a sister, Grace Poff. He died in Los Angeles, California. His grave is located in Glendale's Forest Lawn Memorial Park Cemetery.

Selected filmography

 '49-'17 (1917) - Bald-Headed Wrangler (uncredited)
 The Scarlet Car (1917) - Constable (uncredited)
 The Grand Passion (1918) - Villager (uncredited)
 The Light of Western Stars (1918) - Monta Price
 The Shepherd of the Hills (1919) - Jim Lane
 The Last Straw (1920) - Rev. Beal
 Bonnie May (1920)
 Sand! (1920) - Jim Kirkwood (uncredited)
 Square Shooter (1920) - Sandy
 The Man Who Dared (1920) - Long John
 The Old Swimmin' Hole (1921) - Professor Payne - Schoolmaster
 Big Town Ideas (1921) - Deputy
 The Three Musketeers (1921) - Father Joseph
 The Night Horsemen (1921) - Haw Haw
 Turn to the Right (1922) - Townsman (uncredited)
 Tracked to Earth (1922) - Meeniee Wade
 The Prisoner of Zenda (1922) - Archbishop (uncredited)
 The Village Blacksmith (1922) - Gideon Crane
 Peg o' My Heart (1922) - Priest (uncredited)
 Brass Commandments (1923) - Slim Lally
 Suzanna (1923) - Álvarez
 The Girl I Loved (1923) - Minister (circuit rider)
 Souls for Sale (1923) - Tall Actor in Casting Office (uncredited)
 Main Street (1923) - Chet Dashaway
 The Man Who Won (1923) - Sandy Joyce
 The Untameable (1923) - Bit Role (uncredited)
 The Virginian (1923) - Shorty's Chum (uncredited)
 The Man from Wyoming (1924) - Jim McWilliams
 Excitement (1924) - Roger Cove
 Dante's Inferno (1924) - The Secretary (uncredited)
 Darwin Was Right (1924) - Egbert Swift
 Greed (1924) - Lottery Agent (uncredited)
 A Fool and His Money (1925) - Citizen
 A Thief in Paradise (1925) - Jardine's Secretary
 The Million Dollar Handicap (1925) - Milkman
 Isn't Life Terrible? (1925, Short) - Mr. Jolly
 The Merry Widow (1925) - Sadoja's Lackey (uncredited)
 Without Mercy (1925) - Madame Gordon's 1st Henchman (uncredited)
 Mantrap (1926) - Minister (uncredited)
 Marriage License? (1926) - Footman
 Bardelys the Magnificent (1926) - Prison Friar (uncredited)
 Long Fliv the King (1926)
 The Silent Rider (1927) - Bit Part (uncredited)
 The Tender Hour (1927) - Party Guest
 The First Auto (1927) - D. P. Graves (uncredited)
 Silver Valley (1927) - 'Slim' Snitzer
 The Valley of the Giants (1927) - Bookkeeper (uncredited)
 Two Lovers (1928) - Minor Role (uncredited)
 The Man Who Laughs (1928) - (uncredited)
 Wheel of Chance (1928) - Russian (uncredited)
 Greased Lightning (1928) - Beauty Jones
 The Viking (1928) - Friar Slain by Vikings (uncredited)
 Two Tars (1928, Short) - Motorist
 The Faker (1929) - Hadiran's Aid
 The Iron Mask (1929) - Father Joseph
 Courtin' Wildcats (1929) - Professor
 The Lone Star Ranger (1930) - Townsman (uncredited)
 The Bad One (1930) - (uncredited)
 The Laurel-Hardy Murder Case (1930, Short) - Old Relative (uncredited)
 Noche de duendes (1930) - Anciano (uncredited)
 Tom Sawyer (1930) - Judge Thatcher
 Behind Office Doors (1931) - Mr. Burden (uncredited)
 I Take This Woman (1931) - Marriage License Clerk (uncredited)
 Caught (1931) - Clem
 Way Back Home (1931) - Constable (uncredited)
 Ambassador Bill (1931) - Armored Car Chauffeur (uncredited)
 Stepping Sisters (1932) - The Depression (uncredited)
 The Expert (1932) - Morgue Attendant (uncredited)
 Whistlin' Dan (1932) - Jud Beal - Banker (uncredited)
 So Big (1932) - Deacon (uncredited)
 Midnight Warning (1932) - Welsh (uncredited)
 Mystery of the Wax Museum (1933) - Tall Thin Henchman (uncredited)
 Hello, Everybody! (1933) - Constable
 Diplomaniacs (1933) - Bald Adoop Indian (uncredited)
 Tillie and Gus (1933) - Juror (uncredited)
 Girl Without a Room (1933) - Undertaker (uncredited)
 Kid Millions (1934) - Recorder (uncredited)
 The Mighty Barnum (1934) - Grocer in Montage (uncredited)
 I'll Love You Always (1935) - (uncredited)
 Party Wire (1935) - Townsman (uncredited)
 We're in the Money (1935) - Member of the Jury (uncredited)
 She Couldn't Take It (1935) - Judge (uncredited)
 The Rainmakers (1935) - Townsman (uncredited)
 Flash Gordon (1936, Serial) - High Priest #1 (uncredited)
 The Witness Chair (1936) - Juror (uncredited)
 Let's Sing Again (1936) - (uncredited)
 Bullets or Ballots (1936) - Grand Jury Member (uncredited)
 The White Angel (1936) - Minor Role (uncredited)
 Come and Get It (1936) - Lumberjack (uncredited)
 You Only Live Once (1937) - Halsey (uncredited)
 The Toast of New York (1937) - Mountaineer (uncredited)
 The Texans (1938) - Moody Citizen (uncredited)
 The Adventures of Tom Sawyer (1938) - Bit (uncredited)
 The Great Victor Herbert (1939) - Grouchy Man (uncredited)
 The House of the Seven Gables (1940) - Juror (uncredited)
 Murder in the Air (1940) - Morgue Attendant (uncredited)
 Back in the Saddle (1941) - George C. Joy (uncredited)
 Marry the Boss's Daughter (1941) - Thorndike Beamish (uncredited)
 Sullivan's Travels (1941) - Convict Watching Movie in Church (uncredited)
 I Married an Angel (1942) - Mr. Dodder (uncredited)
 Mrs. Wiggs of the Cabbage Patch (1942) - Cabbage Patch Character (uncredited)
 This Land Is Mine (1943) - Old Man (uncredited)
 The More the Merrier (1943) - Sleeper (uncredited)
 The Great John L. (1945) - Health Restaurateur (uncredited)
 The Desert Horseman (1946) - Café Patron (uncredited)
 Joan of Arc (1948) - Guillaume Colles (uncredited)
 Madame Bovary (1949) - Guest (uncredited)
 Father's Little Dividend (1951) - Old Man on Porch (uncredited)

References

External links

 

1870 births
1952 deaths
American male film actors
American male silent film actors
Male actors from Indiana
People from Bedford, Indiana
20th-century American male actors
Burials at Forest Lawn Memorial Park (Glendale)
Male Western (genre) film actors